Rhizocarpaceae  is a family of crustose, lecideoid, lichen-forming fungi and together with the family Sporastatiaceae it constitutes the order Rhizocarpales in the Ascomycota, class Lecanoromycetes.

Genera
 Catolechia 
 Epilichen 
 Poeltinula 
 Rhizocarpon

References

 
Lecanoromycetes families
Taxa named by Maurice Choisy
Taxa described in 1984
Lichen families